The Oklahoma Sooners men's gymnastics team represents the University of Oklahoma and competes in the Mountain Pacific Sports Federation.  The team has won 12 NCAA National Championships, most recently in 2018.

Roster

Coaching staff

NCAA champions

Athlete awards

Nissen-Emery Award winners 

 Bart Conner (1981)
 Jarrod Hanks (1991)
 Daniel Fink (1998)
 Todd Bishop (1999)
 Daniel Furney (2003)
 Jonathan Horton (2008)
 Steven Legendre (2011)
 Yul Moldauer (2019)

CGA Rookie of the Year 
 Fuzzy Benas (2022)

CGA Specialist of the Year 
 Gage Dyer (2021)

MPSF Gymnast of the Year 
 Jonathan Horton (2008)
 Jake Dalton (2012)
 Presten Ellsworth (2013)
 Yul Moldauer (2018)

Past Olympians 
 Bart Conner (1976, 1984)  
 Guard Young (2004) 
 Jonathan Horton (2008, 2012)  
 Jake Dalton (2012, 2016)
 Chris Brooks (2016)
 Alexander Naddour (2016) 
 Yul Moldauer (2020)
 Allan Bower (2020 alternate)

See also 
 Oklahoma Sooners women's gymnastics

References 

Oklahoma Sooners men's gymnastics
College men's gymnastics teams in the United States